Samuel Higginson (1880 – 1930) was an English footballer who played in the Football League for Bradford City Stoke.

Career
Higginson played football with his local amateur side Goldenhill Wanderers before moving to Stoke in 1899. He immediately became a first team regular making 33 appearances in his first season as a professional. He was used as both a centre forward or centre back due to his physical qualities and he carried on been a key member of the Stoke side during the early 1900s as the side struggled on compete in the First Division. He left for Reading in 1904 after making over 120 appearances for Stoke. His spell at Reading was a short one as he left for Bradford City a season later where he finished his career.

Career statistics

References

English footballers
Bradford City A.F.C. players
Stoke City F.C. players
Reading F.C. players
English Football League players
1880 births
1930 deaths
Association football forwards